Tarundeep Rai (born 22 February 1984, in Namchi, Sikkim, India) is an Indian archer. He is conferred with the Padma Shri, in 2021, by the Government of India, for his contribution in Sports. Earlier, in 2018, he was awarded the Khel Ratan Award.

Career

Tarundeep made his debut in international archery at the age of 19 years when he played at the Asian Archery Championship 2003 held at Yangon, Myanmar.

Tarundeep Rai  won India their maiden individual silver medal in archery at the Asian Games at the 16th Asian Games on 24 November 2010 in Guangzhou, China.

He was a member of the Indian archery team that won the bronze medal at the 15th Asian Games in Doha in 2006.

At the 2004 Summer Olympics, Tarundeep was placed 32nd in the men's individual ranking round with a 72-arrow score of 647. He faced Alexandros Karageorgiou of Greece in the first elimination round, losing 147-143. This score gave Rai a final ranking of 43rd. Rai was also a member of the 11th-place Indian men's archery team at the 2004 Summer Olympics.

A career-threatening shoulder injury forced him to lie low for the best part of two years. He suffered a right shoulder injury due to overuse and was out of action in 2007 and 2008.Tarundeep Rai did not make the men's team at the 2010 Guangzhou Asian Games. only competed in the individual event. But he got into rhythm and clinched a silver medal, which none of us expected.

Tarundeep was a member of the Indian men's recurve team at the 2012 London Olympics. Tarundeep Rai gave the country the third place in the London Olympics qualification round at Ogden, US in 2012.

Tarundeep was a part of the Indian archery team that finished 4th at the 2003 World Championship in New York City. His team won the silver medal at the 2005 World Championship in Madrid, Spain. He also became the first Indian to make it to the semifinal round of the World Archery Championship in 2005, where he narrowly lost to Won Jong Choi of South Korea by 106-112 for the bronze medal play-off.

Tarundeep Rai won three gold medals at South Asian Games in Guwahati and Shillong. Tarun also played a key role in India's dominance in the  South Asian Games.

Awards 
Tarundeep is recipient of the Arjuna Award (2005) for his achievements in archery.

in 2020, the government of India honoured him with the Padma Shri, the fourth highest civilian awards in the Republic Of India.'''

Tokyo Olympics 
Tarundeep Rai along with  Atanu Das  and Praveen Jadhav grabbed the quota for the tokyo olympics. Since the lockdown happen he choose to be in AsI campus and train for  his last olympics. He has Reduced 14 kg weight in 6 months. Tarundeep Rai alongside his teammates defeated Kazakhstan in round of 16 in the men's team event before losing to Republic of Korea in the Quarter Finals. In the individual event, Tarundeep defeated Oleksii Hunbin of Ukraine 6-4 in the 1st round before losing to Itay Shanny of Israel in the 2nd round in a thrilling one arrow shoot-off.

References

External links
Ready, Aim, Aspire...

1984 births
Living people
People from Namchi district
Sportspeople from Sikkim
Indian Gorkhas
Indian male archers
Archers at the 2004 Summer Olympics
Archers at the 2012 Summer Olympics
Archers at the 2020 Summer Olympics
Olympic archers of India
Archers at the 2006 Asian Games
Archers at the 2010 Asian Games
Archers at the 2014 Asian Games
Asian Games silver medalists for India
Asian Games bronze medalists for India
Asian Games medalists in archery
Medalists at the 2006 Asian Games
Medalists at the 2010 Asian Games
Archers at the 2010 Commonwealth Games
Commonwealth Games bronze medallists for India
Commonwealth Games medallists in archery
Recipients of the Arjuna Award
Recipients of the Padma Shri in sports
Rai people
Medallists at the 2010 Commonwealth Games